The 2020–21 Honduran Liga Nacional season was the 55th Honduran Liga Nacional edition since its establishment in 1965.  The tournament started in September 2020 and is scheduled to end in mid 2021.  The season was divided into two halves (Apertura and Clausura), each crowning one champion.  Due to the impact of the COVID-19 pandemic on association football, a new and more compact format is to be used.  The first stage was shortened from 18 to 14 weeks.  The tournament was divided into two groups of five.  The top teams of each group advanced directly to the semifinal round, and the teams finishing 2nd and 3rd from each group had to play a playoff round.  At the end of the season, the three teams with the best record qualified to the 2021 CONCACAF League.

2020–21 teams

A total of 10 teams will contested the tournament, the same that participated in the 2019–20 season since no relegation was implemented.

Apertura
The Apertura tournament was the first half of the 2020–21 season which ran from September 2020 to January 2021.  C.D. Olimpia lifted their second straight title and their 32nd overall.

Regular season

Standings
 Group A

 Group B

Results

Playoffs

Results

Note: Despite their elimination in the semifinals, C.D. Marathón clinched their spot at the extra final series as winners of the regular season first place decider playoff.

Clausura
The Clausura tournament was the second half of the 2020–21 season which was played in the first semester of 2021.  C.D. Olimpia won their third consecutive national championship and their 33rd overall after winning both the regular season and the playoff stage.

Regular season

Standings
 Group A

 Group B

Results

Playoffs

Results

Top goalscorers
The top goalscorer will be determined by the addition of goals of both Apertura and Clausura tournaments.

 As of 19 May 2021

 23 goals:

  Jerry Bengtson (Olimpia)

 15 goals:

  Justin Arboleda (Olimpia)

 14 goals:

  Roberto Moreira (Motagua)

 13 goals:

  Carlos Bernárdez (Platense)
  Luis Palma (Vida)

 12 goals:

  Gonzalo Klusener (Motagua)

 11 goals:

  Eddie Hernández (Olimpia)

 10 goals:

  Rubilio Castillo (Motagua)
  Rony Martínez (R. España / R. Sociedad)
  Yerson Gutiérrez (H. Progreso / Platense)
  Eduardo Rotondi (Honduras Progreso)
  Michaell Chirinos (Olimpia)

 9 goals:

  Rafael Agámez (Honduras Progreso)

 8 goals:

  Diego Rodríguez (Real de Minas)
  Marco Vega (Motagua)
  Alexander Aguilar (Vida)
  Ángel Tejeda (Real España / Vida)
  Ramiro Rocca (Real España)
  Juan Mejía (UPNFM)
  Kevin López (Motagua)

 7 goals:

  Bruno Volpi (Marathón)
  Carlos Meléndez (Vida)
  Edwin Solano (Marathón)
  Carlos Róchez (UPNFM)

 6 goals:

  Mario Martínez (Real España)

 5 goals:

  Osman Melgares (Real Sociedad)
  Kervin Arriaga (Marathón)
  Iván López (Real España / Motagua)

 4 goals:

  Víctor Moncada (UPNFM)
  Ryduan Palermo (Marathón)
  Carlo Costly (Marathón)
  Walter Martínez (Motagua)
  Christian Altamirano (Real Sociedad)
  Diego Reyes (Olimpia)
  Kevin Hoyos (Marathón)
  César Guillén (Vida / UPNFM)

 3 goals:

  Óliver Morazán (Real Sociedad)
  Óscar García (Real de Minas)
  Dábirson Castillo (Platense)
  Aldo Fajardo (Platense)
  Byron Rodríguez (Platense)
  Jairo Róchez (UPNFM)
  Erick Andino (H. Progreso / Real de Minas)
  Bryan Johnson (Marathón / H. Progreso)
  Marcelo Canales (Honduras Progreso)
  Joshua Nieto (Real de Minas)
  Ronal Montoya (UPNFM)
  Michael Osorio (UPNFM)
  Jesse Moncada (Real de Minas / Motagua)
  José Pinto (Olimpia)

 2 goals:

  Jeancarlo Vargas (Platense)
  Allan Banegas (Marathón)
  Víctor Araúz (Platense)
  César Oseguera (Platense)
  Sebastián Colón (Real de Minas)
  Denis Meléndez (Vida)
  Elvin Oliva (Olimpia)
  Luís Vega (Marathón)
  Darixon Vuelto (Real España)
  Yaudel Lahera (Marathón)
  Jason Sánchez (UPNFM)
  Wisdom Quaye (Vida)
  José Velásquez (Vida)
  Marlon Ramírez (Marathón)
  Cristian Sacaza (Honduras Progreso)
  Ilce Barahona (Platense)
  Omar Elvir (Motagua)
  Juan Delgado (H. Progreso / Motagua)
  Carlos Sánchez (Vida)
  Roney Bernárdez (Real de Minas)
  José Tobías (Real Sociedad)
  William Moncada (Real de Minas)
  Allans Vargas (Real España)
  Carlos Fernández (Motagua)
  José Vigil (Marathón)
  Cristopher Meléndez (Motagua)
  Sergio Peña (Motagua)
  Omar Rosas (Real España)
  José García (Olimpia)
  Edder Delgado (Real de Minas)
  Ezequiel Aguirre (Olimpia)
  Henry Romero (Platense)
  Samuel Elvir (UPNFM)
  Matías Galvaliz (Motagua)
  Edwin Rodríguez (Olimpia)

 1 goal:

  Júnior García (Real España)
  José Reyes (Olimpia)
  Bayron Méndez (Motagua)
  Lesvin Medina (UPNFM)
  Kenneth Ulloa (UPNFM)
  Isaías Olariaga (Real Sociedad)
  Jorge Castrillo (Real España)
  Cristian Cálix (Marathón)
  Júnior Lacayo (UPNFM)
  Darwin Andino (Real de Minas)
  Éver Alvarado (Olimpia)
  Jamal Charles (Real Sociedad)
  Alex Martínez (Real Sociedad)
  Micher Antúnez (Vida)
  Elder Torres (Vida)
  Deyron Martínez (Real Sociedad)
  Carlos Argueta (Vida)
  Matías Soto (Real España)
  Marvin Bernárdez (Olimpia)
  Maylor Núñez (Olimpia)
  Yeer Gutiérrez (Real Sociedad)
  Richard Zúniga (Platense)
  Aldo Oviedo (Real de Minas)
  Samuel Córdova (Olimpia)
  Matías Garrido (Olimpia)
  Ted Bodden (UPNFM)
  Mathías Techera (Marathón)
  Hesller Morales (Platense)
  Yeison Mosquera (Honduras Progreso)
  Samuel Lucas (Honduras Progreso)
  Manuel Elvir (UPNFM)
  Héctor Castellanos (Motagua)
  Kílmar Peña (UPNFM)
  Jorge Álvarez (Olimpia)
  Axel Barrios (Real de Minas)
  Luís Meléndez (Vida)
  Jonathan Paz (Olimpia)
  Johnny Leverón (Olimpia)
  Bryan Bernárdez (Vida)
  Óscar García (Motagua)
  Óscar González (Honduras Progreso)
  Jonathan Núñez (Motagua)
  Kendrick Cárcamo (Real Sociedad)
  Yunni Dolmo (Honduras Progreso)
  Jerrick Díaz (UPNFM)
  Maikel García (Real España)
  Franklin Flores (Real España)
  José Domínguez (Platense)
  Luis Argeñal (UPNFM)
  Sendel Cruz (UPNFM)
  Guillermo Chavasco (Vida)
  Joel Membreño (Vida)
  Jonatan Corzo (Real Sociedad)
  Breyner Bonilla (Real Sociedad)
  Brayan Beckeles (Olimpia)
  Henry Güity (Real de Minas)
  Arnold Meléndez (UPNFM)
  Iverson Jiménez (Vida)
  Reinieri Mayorquín (Motagua)
  Yeison Mejía (Real España)
  Josué Villafranca (Motagua)

 1 own-goal:

  Cristian Sacaza (Honduras Progreso)
  José Velásquez (Vida)
  Mathías Techera (Marathón)
  Raúl Santos (Motagua)
  Rafael Agámez (Honduras Progreso)
  Aldair Simanca (Platense)
  Getsel Montes (Real España)
  Edgar Vásquez (UPNFM)
  Yeer Gutiérrez (Real Sociedad)
  Denis Meléndez (Vida)
  Cristopher Meléndez (Motagua)
  Juan Montes (Motagua)

 2 own-goals:

  Marcos Martínez (Platense)
  Óscar González (Honduras Progreso)

Aggregate table
Relegation was determined by the aggregated table of both Apertura and Clausura tournaments.  On 27 April 2021, C.D. Real de Minas was officially relegated after finishing last in the aggregated standings.

External links
 LNP Official

References

Liga Nacional de Fútbol Profesional de Honduras seasons
Liga Nacional
Honduras
Honduran Liga Nacional, 2020-21